Savate Sresthaporn (born 13 April 1963) is a Thai sports shooter. He competed in the men's trap event at the 2020 Summer Olympics.

References

External links
 

1963 births
Living people
Savate Sresthaporn
Savate Sresthaporn
Shooters at the 2020 Summer Olympics
Savate Sresthaporn
Shooters at the 2010 Asian Games
Shooters at the 2014 Asian Games
Shooters at the 2018 Asian Games
Savate Sresthaporn